Naval Air Station North Island or NAS North Island , at the north end of the Coronado peninsula on San Diego Bay in San Diego, California, is part of the largest aerospace-industrial complex in the United States Navy – Naval Base Coronado (NBC), and the home port of several aircraft carriers of the United States Navy. 

The commanding officer of NAS North Island (NASNI) is also the Commanding Officer, Naval Base Coronado (NBC). As such, he or she commands or administers NASNI and seven other naval facilities: Naval Amphibious Base Coronado (NABC); Outlying Field Imperial Beach; Silver Strand Training Complex; Remote Training Site, Warner Springs; Mountain Warfare Training Camp Michael Monsoor; Camp Morena; and Naval Auxiliary Landing Facility San Clemente Island. NBC, with only its commands in the metropolitan San Diego area, brackets the city of Coronado from the entrance to San Diego Bay to the Mexican border. NAS North Island itself is host to 23 aviation squadrons and 80 additional tenant commands and activities—one of which, the Fleet Readiness Center Southwest, is San Diego's largest aerospace employer.

Organization 

NAS North Island also operates two other airfields in the Southern California region. The other is Naval Outlying Landing Field (NOLF) Imperial Beach. The air station was known as Ream Field in the 1950s and 1960s.

NAS North Island resembles a small city in its facility content and its operations. It has its own police and fire departments, as well as advanced military security stations. It has large factory-type buildings which comprise the Naval Aviation Depot, employing 3,300 civilians, and its own commissary, Navy Exchange, and housing units. Recreation facilities include officer, chief petty officer and enlisted clubs, movie theater, golf course, tennis courts, bowling alley, parks and beaches.

Additionally, the base is home to the Navy's only Deep Submergence Rescue Vehicles, Mystic (DSRV-1) and Avalon (DSRV-2). The DSRV motor vessel support ships are also homeported here.

North Island is headquarters for four major military flag staffs including:
 Commander, Naval Air Forces (COMNAVAIRFOR or CNAF), responsible for maintenance and training of all naval aircraft and aircraft carriers in the Atlantic Fleet, Pacific Fleet, the Naval Air Reserve, and the Naval Air Training Command
 Commander, Naval Air Force, U.S. Pacific Fleet (COMNAVAIRPAC or CNAP), responsible for maintenance and training of all naval aircraft and aircraft carriers in the Pacific Fleet. This is a dual-hatted post in that it is concurrently held by the Commander, Naval Air Forces
 Commander, Carrier Strike Group One and Commander, Carrier Strike Group Seven
With all the ships in port, the population of the station is nearly 35,000 active duty military, selected reserve military, and civilian personnel.
Department of Defense (DoD) contractors perform transportation flights from the air station to NALF San Clemente Island. Contractors also provide tactical training warfare for the DoD in joint efforts with the U.S. Navy and U.S. Marine Corps. These aircraft include C-26 Metroliner, Learjet, Gulfstream, and Twin Otter aircraft.

History 

North Island was commissioned a Naval Air Station in 1917, called Naval Air Station San Diego until 1955. On August 15, 1963, the station was granted official recognition as the "Birthplace of Naval Aviation" by resolution of the House Armed Services Committee.

The U.S. Navy's first aviator, Lieutenant Theodore Ellyson, and many of his colleagues were trained at North Island starting as early as 1911. This was just eight years after Orville and Wilbur Wright flew the first manned aircraft at Kitty Hawk, North Carolina. At that time, North Island was an uninhabited sand flat. It had been used in the late 19th century for horseback riding and hunting by guests of J. D. Spreckels's resort hotel, the Hotel del Coronado.

North Island derived its name from the original geography. In the nineteenth century it was referred to as North Coronado Island, because it was separated from South Coronado (now the city of Coronado) by a shallow bay known as the Spanish Bight, which was later filled in 1945 during World War II.  In 1886, North Coronado Island and South Coronado were purchased by a developer to become a residential resort. South Coronado, which is not an island but the terminus of a peninsula known as the Silver Strand, became the city of Coronado.

However, North Coronado was never developed. Instead, Glenn Curtiss opened a flying school and held a lease to the property until the beginning of World War I. Curtiss invited both the U.S. Army and U.S. Navy to use the site for aviation training, with the Navy being the first to open a station in 1912.  However the Navy abandoned its camp and did not return for five years, while the Army established an aviation school in 1913 at the southern end of the island.  In 1917, Congress appropriated the land, and two airfields were commissioned on its sandy flats. The Navy started with a tent city known as "Camp Trouble". As its name suggests, things did not always go well in the early days. The Navy shared North Island with the Army's Signal Corps, Air Service, and Air Corp's Rockwell Field until 1937, when the Army left and the Navy expanded its operations to cover the whole of North Island.

In 1914, then-unknown aircraft builder Glenn Martin took off and demonstrated his pusher aircraft over the island with a flight that included the first parachute jump in the San Diego area. The jump was made by a ninety-pound civilian woman named Tiny Broadwick. Other aviation milestones originating at North Island included the first seaplane flight in 1911, the first mid-air refueling, and the first non-stop transcontinental flight, both in 1923. One of history's most famous aviation feats was the flight of Charles A. Lindbergh from New York to Paris in May 1927. That flight originated at Rockwell Field on North Island on May 10, 1927, when Lindbergh began the first leg of his journey. Forefathers of today's "Blue Angels", the three-plane "Sea Hawks" from VF-6B, the "Felix the Cat" squadron, were thrilling audiences with flight demonstrations as early as 1928. They demonstrated the training skills of Navy fighter and bomber pilots and on many occasions, flew their aircraft in formation with the wings tethered together.

The list of American military pilots trained at North Island reads like the Who's Who of aviation; however, the U.S. was not the only country interested in aviation early in the twentieth century. Six years before the Naval Air Station was commissioned, Glenn Curtiss trained the first group of Japanese aviators at his flying school on North Island. Among them were a Lieutenant Yamada, later the head of the Imperial Japanese Navy's Naval Aviation arm in World War II and Chikuhei Nakajima, founder of Nakajima Aircraft Company.

Even the base's first commanding officer, Lieutenant Commander Earl Winfield Spencer Jr., USN, added a degree of celebrity to North Island. His wife was Wallis Warfield, a prominent socialite who was to remarry twice and finally become Wallis Warfield Spencer Simpson Windsor, better known as the Duchess of Windsor, for whom King Edward VIII abdicated his throne in 1936.

During World War II, North Island was the major continental U.S. base supporting the operating forces in the Pacific. Those forces included over a dozen aircraft carriers, the Coast Guard, Army, Marines, and Seabees. The city of Coronado became home to most of the aircraft factory workers and dependents of the mammoth base which was operating around the clock. Major USO entertainment shows and bond drives were held weekly at the Ship's Service auditorium, which was later replaced by the 2,100 seat Lowry Theater. Famous people stationed here or on ships home ported here during the war years included Douglas Fairbanks Jr., Guy Madison, future television cowboy star of the 1950s and 1960s as Wild Bill Hickok, was at that time Seaman Bob Mosely, a lifeguard at the NAS crews' pool. Stars like the Marx Brothers and Bob Hope appeared regularly at USO shows at the auditorium.

Tenant squadrons

Ships

Tenant commands

Commander, Naval Air Forces
Commander, Naval Air Forces, Pacific Fleet (COMNAVAIRPAC)
Commander, Helicopter Maritime Strike WING Pacific (CHSMWP)
Combat Camera Group, Pacific
Commander, Carrier Strike Group One (CCSG-1)
Commander, Carrier Strike Group Three (CCSG-3)
Commander, Carrier Strike Group Seven (CCSG-7)
Commander, Carrier Strike Group Eleven (CCSG-11)
Commander, Cruiser Destroyer Group One (COMCARDESGRU 1)
Commander Destroyer Group Seven (COMDESRON 7)
Commander, Destroyer Squadron Twenty-One (COMDESRON 21)
Commander, Tactical Air Control Group One (COMTACGRU 1)
Construction Battalion Unit 405 (CBU 405)
Deep Submergence Unit (DSU)
Defense Enterprise Computing Center Det San Diego
DSU Det Mystic (DSRV 1)
DSU Diving System Support Detachment
DSU Unmanned Vehicle Detachment
Fleet Aviation Specialized Operational Training Group Pacific
Fleet Imaging Command Pacific
Fleet Readiness Center Southwest
Fleet Weather Center - San Diego
HSC Weapons School, Pacific
HSM Weapons School, Pacific
Naval Air Technical Data and Engineering Service Center (NATEC)
Naval Computer and Telecommunications Station
Naval Leader Training Unit, Coronado
Naval Pacific Meteorology and Oceanography Center
Naval Public Affairs Support Element, West
Naval Special Clearance Team One
Center for Naval Aviation Technical Training Unit (CNATTU)
Naval Information Warfare Training Group, San Diego (formerly NIOC San Diego)
Navy Reserve Center North Island (formerly Navy Operational Support Center North Island, formerly Naval Air Reserve San Diego)
Maritime Expeditionary Security Squadron(MSS-3)

Climate
NAS North Island features some of the warmest winter temperatures anywhere on the west coast of the continental United States. Under the Köppen climate classification system, it is classified as a semi-arid climate (BSh or warm steppe).

Education
The housing on-post is in the Coronado Unified School District, and the zones for Village Elementary School, Coronado Middle School, and Coronado High School.

See also 

Naval Air Station
List of airports in California
List of United States Navy airfields

References

External links 

Navy Lodge North Island - Beach Front Location
Aviation: From Sand Dunes to Sonic Booms, a National Park Service Discover Our Shared Heritage Travel Itinerary

United States Naval Air Stations
Military facilities in San Diego County, California
Military in San Diego
Coronado, California
San Diego Bay
Tied islands
Airports in San Diego County, California
Airports established in 1917
National Register of Historic Places in San Diego County, California
Historic districts on the National Register of Historic Places in California